{{Album ratings
| rev1 = Allmusic
| rev1Score = 
| rev2 = Muzik
| rev2Score = <ref>{{Cite magazine |last=Ashon |first=Will |author-link=Will Ashon |date=June 1996 |title=Cella Dwellas: Relams 'N' Reality |url=http://www.muzikmagazine.co.uk/issues/muzik013_june_1996.pdf |magazine=Muzik |issue=13 |page=131 |archive-url=https://web.archive.org/web/20220403114048/http://www.muzikmagazine.co.uk/issues/muzik013_june_1996.pdf |archive-date=3 April 2022 |access-date=16 July 2022}}</ref>
| rev3 = The Source| rev3score = 
| noprose = yes
}}Realms 'n Reality is the debut album by rap group, Cella Dwellas. It was released on March 26, 1996 through Loud Records and was mostly produced by Nick Wiz. While it was a critical success, Realms 'n Reality'' was not much of a commercial success, only making it to 160 on the Billboard 200 and 21 on the Top R&B/Hip-Hop Albums.

Two charting singles were released from the album, "Good Dwellas" and "Perfect Match", the latter of which made it to three different Billboard charts.

Track listing
"Advance to Boardwalk" – 3:37  
"Mystic Freestyle" – 3:46  
"Perfect Match" – 4:21  
"Medina Style" – 3:33  
"Recognize 'N Realize" – 4:09  
"Cella Dwellas" – 4:27  
"Wussda Plan" – 4:21  
"Good Dwellas" – 4:22  
"Hold U Down" – 3:24  
"Realm 3" – 4:12  
"Line 4 Line" – 3:26  
"Worries" – 4:01  
"We Got It Hemmed" – 4:40  
"Good Dwellas (Pt. 2)" – 3:33  
"Outro" – 3:48  
"Land of the Lost" – 4:39

Samples
Good Dwellas
"Go on and Cry" by Les McCann
Good Dwellas (Part 2)
"Remind Me" by Patrice Rushen
Mystic Freestyle
"Evening in Paris" by Quincy Jones
Perfect Match
"Funky President" by James Brown
"Winter Sadness" by Kool & the Gang
Recognize N Realize
"In the Rain" by The Dramatics
Worries
"Here's That Rainy Day" by Stan Getz
Hold U Down
"El Space-O" by Stanley Cowell
Land of the Lost
"Born to be Blue" by Jack Bruce

References

1996 debut albums
Cella Dwellas albums
Loud Records albums
RCA Records albums